Thomas W. Knowlton (November 22, 1740 – September 16, 1776) was an American patriot who served in the French and Indian War and was a colonel during the American Revolution.  Knowlton is considered America's first Intelligence professional, and his unit, Knowlton's Rangers, gathered intelligence during the early Revolutionary War.  Knowlton was killed in action at the Battle of Harlem Heights.

Early life and education
Knowlton was born into a military family on November 22, 1740, in West Boxford, Massachusetts. When he was eight, his family relocated to a farm in Ashford, Connecticut (current property of the June Norcross Webster Scout Reservation).  In 1755, at fifteen, Knowlton served in the French and Indian War with his older brother Daniel.  He enlisted in Captain John Durkee's company, and is known to have joined Daniel on scouting missions into enemy territory. He later served in Captain John Slapp's 8th Company, where he served with Throope Chapman. He served during six campaigns in the war and was promoted to lieutenant in 1760.  He also fought in Israel Putnam's company against the Spanish during the British expedition against Cuba in 1762.

By August 1762, Knowlton had returned home and married Anna Keyes.  He and his wife raised nine children.  At the age of thirty-three, Knowlton was appointed a Selectman of Ashford, Connecticut.

Battle of Bunker Hill 

On April 18, 1775, General Thomas Gage dispatched a contingent of British troops to Lexington and Concord, about fifteen miles from Boston, Massachusetts. This action led to the outbreak of hostilities that became the American Revolution.  On learning of the Battles of Lexington and Concord, the militias of Massachusetts, Connecticut and New Hampshire communities mobilized their members.  Thomas Knowlton joined his militia, the Ashford Company, which became part of the 5th Connecticut Regiment, along with the men from Windham, Mansfield and Coventry, Connecticut. Knowlton was chosen unanimously as captain and led 200 men into Massachusetts. His force consisted of farmers, without uniforms, primarily armed with shotguns.

Knowlton was ordered to Charlestown to join Colonel William Prescott.  Knowlton's troops were sent by Colonel Prescott to oppose the advancing British grenadiers, and took their posts on the side of Breed's hill.  Knowlton was in command of a 200 men work party. His men dismantled another fence further back and used its rails to strengthen the existing fence, and they filled the space between with new-mown grass which formed an effective breastwork. There they held their ground until the general retreat, and were among those providing cover as the troops retreated.  Only three men from Knowlton's company died in the battle.

In 1776, Knowlton was sent by General Washington during the Siege of Boston to burn any remaining buildings at the base of Bunker Hill, with orders to capture any British troops guarding the location. Knowlton accomplished his mission without firing a shot or losing a single man.    
 
Years later, Colonel Aaron Burr said: "I had a full account of the Battle from Knowlton's own lips, and I believe if the chief command had been entrusted to him, the issue would have proved more fortunate. It was impossible to promote such a man too rapidly."  In June 1775, for his bravery at Bunker Hill, Knowlton was promoted by Congress to major.  One of his men later remembered that Knowlton was very courageous, never crying, Go on, boys! but always, Come on, boys!.  On January 8, 1776, he led a troop in a successful incursion into Charlestown to burn housing used by British officers.

Knowlton's Rangers

On August 12, 1776, General of the Army George Washington promoted Knowlton to lieutenant colonel. He was ordered to select a group of men from Connecticut, Rhode Island, and Massachusetts to carry out reconnaissance missions.  America's first official spies, "Knowlton's Rangers" were also the first organized American elite troops.  The American spy, Captain Nathan Hale, was under the command of Lieutenant Colonel Thomas Knowlton.  The date "1776" on the modern U.S. Army's intelligence service seal refers to the formation of Knowlton's Rangers.
 
On September 16, 1776, a company of rangers led by Knowlton was scouting in advance of Washington's army at the Battle of Harlem Heights.  While reconnoitering the British outposts they were engaged by elements of the light infantry brigade commanded by  Major General Alexander Leslie.  They managed a successful retreat and later mounted a counter-attack with the support of riflemen led by Major Andrew Leitch of Virginia.  General Washington ordered the units to fall on the enemy's rear, while a feint in front engaged the British troops’ attention. Knowlton's force turned prematurely and made contact with the right flank of the British instead, losing the element of surprise. In the face of heavy fire from the British, Knowlton rallied his troops to carry on the attack.  Both American commanding officers fell mortally wounded in front of their men.  Knowlton's loss was lamented by Washington in his general orders for September 17, 1776 with the statement "The gallant and brave Col Knowlton, ... would have been an Honor to any Country, having fallen yesterday, while gloriously fighting ...for his country ".

Knowlton Award 
In 1995 the Military Intelligence Corps Association established the LTC Thomas W. Knowlton Award. The Knowlton Award recognizes individuals who have contributed significantly to the promotion of Army Military Intelligence in ways that stand out in the eyes of the recipients, their superiors, subordinates and peers. These individuals must also demonstrate the highest standards of integrity and moral character, display an outstanding degree of professional competence, and serve the MI Corps with distinction.

An August 1, 2012 posthumous recipient of the Knowlton Award was Marian Rejewski, the mathematician-cryptologist at the Polish General Staff's Cipher Bureau who in late 1932 reconstructed the German military Enigma cipher machine. Marian Rejewski's posthumous Knowlton Award was accepted at his home town, Bydgoszcz, Poland, on September 4, 2012, by his mathematician daughter, Janina Sylwestrzak.

References

Sources
, 160 pages
, 384 pages

Further reading

External links
  Portrait by John Trumbull
  Statue
 George Washington's General Orders dated September 17, 1776
 Thomas Knowlton Genealogy Information from descendant Thomas Knowlton Gibson

1740 births
1776 deaths
United States military personnel killed in the American Revolutionary War
American spies
People of colonial Connecticut
People from Ashford, Connecticut
Continental Army officers from Connecticut
People of Connecticut in the French and Indian War
United States Army Rangers
Military personnel from Connecticut
American spies during the American Revolution